The Church of St. Dunat is a Roman Catholic church located on the island of Krk, Croatia.

Location
Church of St. Dunat was built at the intersection of roads leading to Punat, Krk, Kornić and Vrbnik where the Bay of Punat is most encased in the land, that is, at the bottom of Bay of Punat, by the sea.

The significance, dating and form
With the churches in Nin and Zadar, this one is the most important monument of early Croatian architecture. It cannot be determined with certainty when was it constructed. According to some, it was built in the 9th century. However, the information board near the church says that it was built in the 12th century.

Church has a four-leafed cruciform layout, square entrance and base with a dome covering it. Present-day appearance is undoubtedly significantly different from the previous, when it was covered with carved stone from the outside, which can still be seen only at the bottom. It was probably  decorated with mosaics and frescoes from the inside. It seems as if the unskilled master built it entirely spontaneously with no accurate measures and models.

First mention
Church was first mentioned in year 1565 when the Bishop Petar Bembo visited the area, and had examined witnesses which stated that the church was donated by bishop Donat a Turre (1484-1515) to the owners of terrains around Kornić. After his death, they have sold terrains which was followed by the period of edifices deterioration. During the visit of bishop Donat, a poor condition of church was determined. It was mentioned that it didn't have floor nor the door, while only preserved was altar.

Dedication
Church is dedicated to St. Dunat (not to be mistaken with Donatus of Zadar), an early Christian saint who was martyred during the persecution of emperor Julian the Apostate in the second half of the 4th century. It is not known whom it was originally dedicated to.

History of deterioration and renovation
In addition to previously mentioned churches poor state, there is no other information about it so it can be assumed that it wasn't used for holding Holy Mass but was in the process of deterioration over the years. Church was restored in 1914 thanks to the Austrian conservator Anton Gnirs from Pula. However, immediately after World War II it was again damaged. Namely, in the immediate vicinity of the church was an inn of Maračić family where Yugoslav Partisans stored their weapons and ammunition during the war. On 3 October 1945 the explosion that badly damaged church, namely its dome, occurred. The explosion was so strong that it was heard all over the island. 15 islanders who have sought refuge in the surrounding fields and along the coast were killed while the area of the inn turned into a crater. Three years later, the church was restored to its present-day appearance. The renovation was led by the architect . At the site of the former inn was built another one, while a small harbor was built nearby.

Gallery

Sources
Bolonić, Mihovil, Žic Rokov, Ivan: Otok Krk kroz vijekove, Kršćanska sadašnjost, Zagreb, 2002., 
Ragužin, Alojzije: Punat 1, Povijesno društvo otoka Krka, Krk, 1991.
Lešić, Denis: Otok Krk - vodič u riječi i slici, 2003.

Churches in Croatia
Archaeological sites in Croatia
Medieval architecture
Romanesque architecture in Croatia
12th-century establishments in Croatia
Buildings and structures in Primorje-Gorski Kotar County
Medieval sites in Croatia